The Katherine Mansfield Menton Fellowship, formerly known as the New Zealand Post Katherine Mansfield Prize and the Meridian Energy Katherine Mansfield Memorial Fellowship, is one of New Zealand's foremost literary awards. Named after Katherine Mansfield, one of New Zealand's leading historical writers, the award gives winners ("fellows", whether male or female) funding towards transport to and accommodation in Menton, France, where Mansfield did some of her best-known and most significant writing.

Overview
The fellowship is awarded to New Zealand citizens and residents whose fiction, poetry, literary non-fiction, children’s fiction or playwriting has had "favourable impact". Unlike the Ockham New Zealand Book Awards, which are the best-known New Zealand literary awards, the fellowship is awarded to an individual to develop their future work, rather than for a specific already-published work.

In addition to funding towards transport and accommodation, fellows are given access to a room beneath the terrace of the Villa Isola Bella for use as a study. Mansfield spent long periods at the Villa Isola Bella in 1919 and 1920 after she contracted tuberculosis, and did some of her most significant work there. The climate in southern France was thought to be beneficial to her health.

The fellowship is managed by the Arts Foundation of New Zealand with the support of an advisory committee that includes members of the Winn-Manson Menton Trust.

History
The fellowship was conceived in the late 1960s by New Zealand writer Celia Manson and arts patron Sheilah Winn. Manson and her husband had visited the Villa Isola Bella where Mansfield did some of her most significant writing (including the short stories "The Daughters of the Late Colonel", "The Stranger" and "Life of Ma Parker"), and discovered that a room on the lower level where she worked was derelict and not in use. Manson and Winn decided to set up a fellowship for New Zealand authors, and formed a committee in Wellington to raise funds. Their vision was "to give a selected New Zealand writer a period of leisure to write or study ... [in] a different and more ancient culture, and thereby to see [their] own remote country in a better perspective". Initially the fellowship was administered by the New Zealand Women Writers' Society. Subsequently, the Winn-Mason Menton Trust was established to run the fellowship, and the first recipient was poet Owen Leeming in 1970.

The fellowship was first sponsored by Meridian Energy, and from 2007 to 2011 by the New Zealand Post. From 2012 to 2014, Creative New Zealand contributed a yearly grant. Over the years the fellowship also received funding from both the French and New Zealand governments. The Katherine Mansfield Room at the Villa Isola Bella was furnished by the City of Menton for the fellows' use. In 2015, a fundraising campaign overseen by the Winn-Mason Menton Trust and a volunteer campaign committee raised NZ$730,000 to ensure the fellowship's long-term survival and that it would no longer be dependent on sponsorship.

The fellowship has been awarded to a number of well-known New Zealand authors. In 2000, the Victoria University Press published As Fair as New Zealand to Me, a collection of the memories of twenty-three fellows, written in the form of letters to Mansfield. Janet Frame set her novel, In the Memorial Room, in Menton, telling the fictional story of a writer on a poetry fellowship. Although she wrote the novel in the 1970s it was not published until after her death in 2013.

Due to the COVID-19 pandemic, the 2020 fellow, Sue Wootton, was unable to travel to Menton to take up the fellowship in either 2020 or 2021.

Recipients
The writers to have held the fellowship are listed below:

 1970 Owen Leeming
 1971 Margaret Scott
 1972 C K Stead
 1973 James McNeish
 1974 Janet Frame
 1975 David Mitchell
 1976 Michael King
 1977 Barry Mitcalfe
 1978 Spiro Zavos
 1979 Philip Temple
 1980 Marilyn Duckworth
 1981 Lauris Edmond
 1982 Michael Jackson
 1983 Allen Curnow
 1984 Rowley Habib
 1985 Michael Gifkins
 1986 Michael Harlow
 1987 Russell Haley
 1988 Louis Johnson
 1989 Lloyd Jones
 1990 Lisa Greenwood
 1991 Nigel Cox
 1992 Maurice Gee
 1993 Witi Ihimaera
 1994 Vincent O’Sullivan
 1995 Fiona Farrell
 1996 Owen Marshall
 1997 Roger Hall
 1998 Maurice Shadbolt
 1999 Elizabeth Knox
 2000 Stephanie Johnson
 2001 Catherine Chidgey
 2002 Jenny Bornholdt
 2003 Tessa Duder
 2004 Bill Manhire
 2005 Ian Wedde
 2006 Fiona Kidman
 2007 Stuart Hoar
 2008 Damien Wilkins
 2009 Jenny Pattrick
 2010 Ken Duncum
 2011 Chris Price
 2012 Justin Paton
 2013 Greg McGee
 2014 Mandy Hager
 2015 Anna Jackson
 2016 Kate Camp
 2017 Carl Nixon
 2019 Paula Morris
 2020 Sue Wootton

See also
 Katherine Mansfield Memorial Award (a prize awarded to short stories also named for Mansfield, offered from 1959 to 2014)
 List of New Zealand literary awards

External links
 Official website

References

New Zealand literary awards
1970 establishments in New Zealand